Elfving is a Scandinavian surname. It may refer to:

David Elfving (born 1985), Swedish bandy player
Gustav Elfving (1908–1984), Finnish mathematician and statistician
Ulf Elfving (born 1942), Swedish journalist and broadcaster
William Elfving (born 1941), U.S. judge

Surnames of Scandinavian origin